Ejby is a village in Køge Municipality, with a population of 3,098 (1 January 2022), on the Danish island of Zealand. The village is located about 8 kilometres/5 miles west of the town of Køge.

Since the 1960s, when Ejby was a small village with a population of only a few hundreds, the village has grown rapidly and is now surrounded by residential areas of single-family detached homes and terraced houses.

The first privately run kindergarten in Denmark, Gemsevejens Kindergarten (Danish: Gemsevejens Børnehus), which was outsourced to ISS A/S in 1998, is located in Ejby. Today the kindergarten is operated by the TitiBo group.

Ejby church, a typical Danish village church from the 12th century, is located on the western outskirts of the old original village.

References

Cities and towns in Region Zealand
Køge Municipality